Siliștea is a commune in Constanța County, Northern Dobruja, Romania.

The commune includes two villages:
 Siliștea (historical name: Tașpunor, Tașpunar or Taș-Punar)
 Țepeș Vodă (historical names: Chiorcișme, Chior-Cișmea) - named after Vlad III the Impaler (Vlad Țepeș in the common Romanian reference)

Demographics
At the 2011 census, Siliștea had 1,270 Romanians (97.09%), 38 Tatars (2.91%).

References

Communes in Constanța County
Localities in Northern Dobruja